The 2020 African Rhythmic Gymnastics Championships also known as The 15th African Championships was held from 10 to 15 March 2020 in Sharm El Sheikh, Egypt. This was the second time that the African Rhythmic Gymnastics Championships were hosted by Egypt. These championships are organized in conjunction with the African Aerobic Gymnastics Championships.

Senior medal winners

Team

Individual

Group

References 

2020 in Egyptian sport
2020 in gymnastics
Gymnastics in Egypt
African Rhythmic Gymnastics
African Rhythmic Gymnastics Championships